Lihpao Racing Park is a  motorsport race track, situated in the Houli District of Taichung, Taiwan.

History
The construction project was presented in 2015 by Yue-Mei International Development Corp, with the intention of holding four international events, including one Formula 3 race and fifty private events per year. The track would be built around the pre-existing karting track. Construction work began in August 2017, in partnership with Audi, and was completed in November of the following year. The track has received FIA Grade 2 certification. 

In 2022, the circuit became the main venue for the annual TCR Taiwan Series.

Notes

References

Lihpao
Lihpao